Cyperus niger is a species of sedge known by the common name black flatsedge. This plant is native to the Americas, where it can be found in wet areas from South and Central America to the southwestern United States, from California and Oklahoma south to Argentina.

Cyperus niger is a perennial herb with small, wispy rhizomes. There may be a few long, thin leaves around the base of the plant. The thin stems often grow bunched together and may reach half a meter in height. The inflorescence contains a few to over 20 spikelets, each under a centimeter long, flat, and containing usually fewer than ten flowers. Each flower is covered by an oval-shaped dark brown or greenish bract. The fruit is a discoid achene just over a millimeter long.

See also
 List of Cyperus species

References

External links
USDA Plants Profile
Photo gallery

niger
Plants described in 1798
Flora of Mexico
Flora of the Southwestern United States
Flora of Central America
Flora of South America